Batau may refer to:

Lablab purpureus, a bean species
Batau, Iran, a village in Razavi Khorasan Province, Iran
 Batau F.C., a South African football (soccer) club